Francisco Diego Alarcón y Covarrubias or Francisco Díaz Alarcón y Covarrubias (29 March 1589 – 18 May 1675) was a Roman Catholic prelate who served as Bishop of Córdoba (1657–1675), Bishop of Pamplona (1648–1657), Bishop of Salamanca (1645–1648), and Bishop of Ciudad Rodrigo (1639–1645).

Biography
Francisco Diego Alarcón y Covarrubias was born in Valladolid, Spain on 29 March 1589. On 11 Apr 1639, he was appointed during the papacy of Pope Urban VIII as Bishop of Ciudad Rodrigo. On 18 September 1639, he was consecrated bishop by Diego Castejón Fonseca, Bishop Emeritus of Lugo, with Juan Alonso y Ocón, Bishop of Yucatán, and Timoteo Pérez Vargas, Bishop of Ispahan,  serving as co-consecrators. On 18 October 1645, he was appointed during the papacy of Pope Innocent X as Bishop of Salamanca. On 1 March 1648, he was selected by the King of Spain and confirmed by Pope Innocent X on 6 Jul 1648 as Bishop of Pamplona. On 24 September 1657, he was appointed during the papacy of Pope Alexander VII as Bishop of Córdoba. He served as Bishop of Córdoba until his death on 18 May 1675.

References

External links and additional sources
 (for Chronology of Bishops)
 (for Chronology of Bishops)
 (for Chronology of Bishops)
 (for Chronology of Bishops)
 (for Chronology of Bishops)
 (for Chronology of Bishops)
 (for Chronology of Bishops) 
 (for Chronology of Bishops) 

17th-century Roman Catholic bishops in Spain
Bishops appointed by Pope Urban VIII
Bishops appointed by Pope Innocent X
Bishops appointed by Pope Alexander VII
1589 births
1675 deaths